Events in the year 2009 in Portugal.

Incumbents
President: Aníbal Cavaco Silva
Prime Minister: José Sócrates

Events

May 2009 to early 2010 – A flu pandemic resulted in 122 deaths in Portugal.

11 October – Portuguese local election, 2009

Arts and entertainment
To Die Like a Man, a Portuguese drama film directed by João Pedro Rodrigues.
In music: Portugal in the Eurovision Song Contest 2009.

Sports
Football (soccer) competitions: Primeira Liga, Liga de Honra, Taça da Liga, Taça de Portugal.

Deaths

26 January – Fernando Amaral, politician (b. 1925).
3 February – António dos Reis Rodrigues, Roman Catholic Bishop (b. 1918) 
17 February – Conchita Cintrón, Chile-born Peruvian torera (female bullfighter), died in Lisbon (born 1922)
11 May – António Lopes dos Santos, army general and colonial administrator (b. 1919).
25 May – Tomás Paquete, Olympic sprinter (b. 1923).
17 June – José Calvário, songwriter (b. 1951).
27 July – Edite Soeiro, journalist (b. 1934).
8 August – Raul Solnado, actor and comedian (b. 1929)
24 November – Gonçalves Isabelinha, footballer (b. 1908)

See also
List of Portuguese films of 2009

References

 
2000s in Portugal
Portugal
Years of the 21st century in Portugal
Portugal